Question Writer is a quiz authoring tool for Microsoft Windows. It is used for authoring questions and compiling them into quizzes in HTML5 format. The software is published by Central Question.

User interface 
The user interface treats each quiz as a separate document. The document interface makes available the questions in a tree-view on the left hand side and a large preview pane on the right hand side. This pane can display a preview of the question, section or entire quiz. The software uses a multiple document interface allowing a number of quizzes to be open simultaneously. Drag and drop is used to re-order questions within a quiz and copy questions between quizzes.

Versions 
Question Writer is in its third iteration and comes in three editions, 'Basic', 'Standard' and 'Professional'. The Basic version is made freely available for personal use but is restricted to multiple choice questions. The Standard version has a wider range of question types, features and quiz themes. The Professional version adds more advanced features, notably a partial credit question and question pooling.

Features 
Question Writer users create quizzes by adding questions and choosing the settings that apply to the quiz. The main settings allow changes to do with question randomization and selection, time limits, the reporting and feedback level, the marking scheme and the passing score.

8 question types can be used, those are
 Multiple Choice
 Multiple Response
 Matching
 Sequencing
 Fill in the Blank
 Essay
 True/False
 Partial Credit

Manual 
The manual is available online as a WikiBook.

Publishing 
Quizzes can be published for the web, in which case a SWF is compiled and exported together with a small driver HTML and JavaScript file. Quizzes can also be published as SCORM packages, in which case the files are published inside a SCORM 1.2 compliant zip file. Question Writer is notable in that it compiles all the resources of a quiz into a single standalone SWF file.

File formats 
Question Writer makes use of various file formats. The main ones are:

References 

Authoring systems
Web development software
Training
Educational software